A prime rate or prime lending rate is an interest rate used by banks, usually the interest rate at which banks lend to customers with good credit. Some variable interest rates may be expressed as a percentage above or below prime rate.

Use in different banking systems

United States and Canada

Historically, in North American banking, the prime rate was the actual interest rate, although this is no longer the case. The prime rate varies little among banks and adjustments are generally made by banks at the same time, although this does not happen frequently.  the prime rate is 7.50% in the United States and 6.45% in Canada.

In the United States, the prime rate runs approximately 300 basis points (or 3 percentage points) above the federal funds rate, which is the interest rate that banks charge each other for overnight loans made to fulfill reserve funding requirements. The Federal funds rate plus a much smaller increment is frequently used for lending to the most creditworthy borrowers, as is LIBOR, the London Interbank Offered Rate. The Federal Open Market Committee (FOMC) meets eight times per year to set a target for the federal funds rate.

Prior to December 17, 2008, the Wall Street Journal followed a policy of changing its published prime rate when 23 out of 30 of the United States' largest banks changed their prime rates. Recognizing that fewer, larger banks now control most banking assets (that is, it is more concentrated), the Journal now publishes a rate reflecting the base rate posted by at least 70% of the top ten banks by assets.

Malaysia
Effective January 2, 2015, the Base Lending Rate (BLR) structure was replaced with a new Base Rate (BR) system. Under BR, which will now serve as the main reference rate for new retail floating rate loans, banks in Malaysia can determine their interest rate based on a formula set by Bank Negara, the Malaysian central bank.

Malayan Banking Bhd (Maybank) has set a group-wide base rate at 3.2%, effective Jan 2, 2015. All new retail loans and financing such as mortgages, unit trust loans, share margin financing, personal financing and overdraft facilities which are applied for by individual customers will be based on the base rate. Though certain banks may be setting a higher BR compared to others, they can sometimes offer lower ELR to customers in order to remain competitive. Loans that are already approved and extended prior to January 2, 2015 will still follow the old BLR until the end of the loan tenure.

Uses
The prime rate is used often as an index in calculating rate changes to adjustable-rate mortgages (ARM) and other variable rate short-term loans. It is used in the calculation of some private student loans. Many credit cards and home equity lines of credit with variable interest rates have their rate specified as the prime rate (index) plus a fixed value commonly called the spread or margin.

See also
 FRED (Federal Reserve Economic Data)

References

External links
 International Prime Rates published by The Wall Street Journal Online
 HSH Associates, Financial Publishers
 Current Rate, Definition & Historical Graph

Banking
Federal Reserve System
Financial economics
Interest rates

it:Prime rate